Harold Watson "Trey" Gowdy III (born August 22, 1964) is an American television news personality, former politician, and former federal prosecutor who served as the U.S. representative for  from 2011 to 2019. His district included much of the Upstate region of South Carolina, including Greenville and Spartanburg.

Before his congressional career, Gowdy served as a federal prosecutor in the District of South Carolina from 1994 to 2000 and then as the solicitor (district attorney) for South Carolina's Seventh Judicial Circuit, comprising Spartanburg and Cherokee counties from 2000 to 2010. From 2014 to 2016, Gowdy chaired the United States House Select Committee on Benghazi which was partly responsible for discovering the existence of Hillary Clinton's private email server. His investigative committee spent over two and a half years and $7.8 million investigating the events surrounding the 2012 Benghazi attack, ultimately not finding evidence of specific wrong-doing by then-Secretary of State Clinton. Gowdy pressed for the prosecution of Hillary Clinton during the 2016 presidential campaign. Beginning in June 2017 he chaired the House Oversight Committee.

On January 31, 2018, Gowdy announced that he would not seek re-election in 2018 and that he intended to pursue a legal career instead of politics. He has since joined the law firm Nelson Mullins Riley & Scarborough, and also joined Fox News as a contributor. He was promoted in 2021 to host Fox News Primetime and then Sunday Night in America with Trey Gowdy.

Early life and education
Gowdy was born on August 22, 1964, in Greenville, South Carolina. He is the son of Novalene (Evans) and Harold Watson "Hal" Gowdy Jr., MD. He grew up in Spartanburg, where as a young man he delivered newspapers for the local daily and worked at the community market. Gowdy graduated from Spartanburg High School in 1982 and earned a Bachelor of Arts degree in history from Baylor University in 1986. While at Baylor he was a member of Kappa Omega Tau. He graduated Juris Doctor from the University of South Carolina School of Law in 1989.

Legal career
Gowdy worked as judicial law clerk for John P. Gardner on the South Carolina Court of Appeals as well as for federal judge G. Ross Anderson of the United States District Court for the District of South Carolina. He then went into private practice at Nelson, Mullins, Riley & Scarborough in Greenville, South Carolina before being appointed as an assistant United States Attorney in April 1994. Gowdy received the Postal Inspector's Award for the successful prosecution of J. Mark Allen, one of "America's Most Wanted" suspects.

In February 2000, he left the United States Attorney's Office to run for 7th Circuit solicitor. He defeated Solicitor Holman Gossett who was an incumbent, in the Republican primary and he ran unopposed in the general election. Gowdy was re-elected in 2004 and 2008, both times unopposed. During his tenure he appeared in four episodes of the television program Forensic Files, as well as Dateline NBC and SCETV. He prosecuted the set of criminal cases and seven of them were death penalty cases.

U.S. House of Representatives

Elections

2010

Despite getting a 93% lifetime rating from the American Conservative Union, Inglis had angered the conservative wing of the Republican Party by taking stances that were perceived to be more moderate than those he had taken when he first represented the district from 1993 to 1999; besides opposing elements in his own party on issues including climate change, he attracted attention as a member of the Judiciary Committee for providing the deciding vote that prevented a measure designed to protect the phrase "under God" in the Pledge of Allegiance from coming to the House floor. Gowdy was one of several candidates in the 2010 primary who ran well to Inglis' right. Inglis had drawn five Republican challengers, including Gowdy. In the June 2010 primary, Gowdy ranked first with 39% of the vote, short of the 50% majority threshold to win outright and avoid a run-off. Inglis received 27% of the vote. Jim Lee got 14%, State Senator David L. Thomas got 13%, and former Historian of the United States House of Representatives Christina Jeffrey was last with 7% of the vote.

In the run-off election, Gowdy defeated Inglis 70–30%. The 4th district was considered so heavily Republican that it was widely presumed Gowdy had clinched a seat in Congress with his primary victory. Gowdy defeated Democratic nominee Paul Corden 63–29%.

2012

Gowdy ran for re-election to a second term against Democrat Deb Morrow. During redistricting following the 2010 census, one proposed map saw large portions of Gowdy's home county of Spartanburg County cut out of the district, while leaving all of Greenville County within the district. Gowdy was initially quoted as being "disappointed" with the version, even though the redrawn 4th would have been as solidly Republican as its predecessor. The final map moved a portion of Greenville County to the 3rd district while leaving almost all of Spartanburg County in the 4th district (except for a sliver that was moved to the 5th district). Gowdy was quoted as being "pleased" with this version, since Greenville and Spartanburg counties remained linked. Roll Call rated his district as Safe Republican in 2012. Gowdy easily secured a second term, defeating Morrow 65–34%.

2014

Gowdy ran for re-election again in 2014. His only opponent was Libertarian Curtis E. McLaughlin. He was reelected with 85% of the popular vote.

2016
In the November 2016 election, Gowdy faced Democrat Chris Fedalei, a 26-year-old attorney. He defeated Fedalei with 67% of the vote to retain his seat.

Tenure
According to Politico during his tenure in Congress, Gowdy was "considered one of the GOP's most versatile and skilled legal experts, owing to his background as a federal prosecutor." While chairing the House Oversight Committee Gowdy tackled high-profile investigations. Democrats criticized Gowdy for conducting his investigations in a partisan fashion. After Trump became president, Gowdy defended the FBI and Special Counsel Robert Mueller's investigation into Russian interference in the 2016 election to the dismay of Trump supporters. However, in a June 2018 hearing, Gowdy urged Deputy Attorney General Rod Rosenstein to wrap up the special counsel investigation. Rosenstein rejected the suggestion, saying the special counsel investigation should finish "appropriately". Democrats criticized Gowdy for not fully pursuing investigations into potential conflicts of interest in the Trump White House or investigating the White House security clearance process.

In August 2011, during the 2011 United States debt ceiling crisis, Gowdy opposed Speaker John Boehner's debt limit bill, and he voted against the final debt ceiling agreement. He also opposed the 2011 defense authorization bill, citing concerns about the prospect of Americans being detained without trial on national security grounds. In December 2010, he told Congressional Quarterly that he would support a measure only if its sponsor could demonstrate that the Constitution gave the government the power to act in a particular realm.

Gowdy worked on the Committee on the Judiciary, the Committee on Oversight and Government Reform, and the Committee on Education and the Workforce. Gowdy frequently spoke on the floor of the House on issues ranging from Operation Fast and Furious to his support for reauthorization of the Violence Against Women Act.

In 2012, he received the Defender of Economic Freedom award from the fiscally conservative 501(c)4 organization Club for Growth. The award is given to members of Congress who have the year's highest ranking, according to the Club for Growth's metrics. Gowdy scored 97 out of 100, and was one of 34 congressmen given the award.

An ardent social conservative, Gowdy considers himself "pro-life plus." He not only believes "in the sanctity of life," but argues that "the strategy should be broader than waiting for the Supreme Court to revisit Roe v. Wade."

Gowdy signed the Contract from America, which aims to defund, repeal, and replace the Patient Protection and Affordable Care Act, limit United States Environmental Protection Agency regulations, enact a reform of the federal tax code, pass a balanced budget amendment, and end earmarks.

In May 2018, Gowdy challenged President Trump's accusation saying that the FBI had spied on his 2016 presidential campaign. As a result Gowdy was attacked by various Trump allies; Politico reported that Gowdy was "virtually alone, getting little support from his House colleagues." In June 2018, Speaker Paul Ryan came out in support of Gowdy, saying that Gowdy's assessment was "accurate".

At a July 2018 congressional hearing, Gowdy suggested there was impropriety on behalf of FBI agent Peter Strzok and said that Strzok had shown bias in favor of Hillary Clinton and against Donald Trump during the 2016 presidential election. He said that this had shaped Strzok's work for the FBI. During the hearing Gowdy repeatedly pressed Strzok about a text message saying Strzok said "we'll stop Trump". Strzok said that a "We'll stop Trump" text message was written late at night and off-the-cuff shortly after controversial remarks were made by Trump towards the family of an American war veteran, and that the message reflected Strzok's belief that Americans would not vote for a candidate who engaged in such "horrible, disgusting behavior". Strzok said the message "was in no way—unequivocally—any suggestion that me, the FBI, would take any action whatsoever to improperly impact the electoral process for any candidate." He added that he knew of information during the 2016 presidential campaign that could have damaged Trump but that he never contemplated leaking it. Strzok said that the investigation into him and the Republicans' related rhetoric was misguided and played into "our enemies' campaign to tear America apart."

Legislation
On March 4, 2014, Gowdy introduced the ENFORCE the Law Act of 2014 into the House. The bill would give the United States House of Representatives and the United States Senate the ability to sue the President of the United States in a federal district court to clarify a federal law (that is, seek a declaratory judgment) in the event that the executive branch is not enforcing the law. House Republicans argued that the bill was necessary because the Obama Administration refused to enforce the laws. H.R. 4138 passed the House but failed to become law.

Committee assignments
 Committee on the Judiciary
 Subcommittee on Constitution and Civil Justice
 Subcommittee on Crime, Terrorism, Homeland Security and Investigations (Chairman)
 Committee on Oversight and Government Reform (Chairman)
 Subcommittee on Health Care, Benefits and Administrative Rules
 Subcommittee on Intergovernmental Affairs
 Permanent Select Committee on Intelligence

Caucus memberships
 Republican Study Committee

Presidential politics 

In July 2015, Republican nominee Donald Trump named Gowdy as a possible nominee for United States Attorney General in a Trump cabinet. In late December 2015, Gowdy endorsed Senator Marco Rubio for president, praising him as a rarity among elected officials for having kept his campaign promises. Gowdy's endorsement strained his relations with Donald Trump's campaign; Trump said that Gowdy had "failed miserably on Benghazi". Rubio withdrew from the race in March 2016, after losing his home state of Florida to Trump. Two months later on May 20, Gowdy endorsed Trump for president, admitting that while he was a "Rubio guy" he would support the presumptive Republican nominee.
After the May 2017 dismissal of FBI Director Comey, Gowdy was being considered for his replacement. However the veteran representative told Attorney General Sessions that he wanted to remain in his congressional seat.

On December 1, 2017, the Congressional Office of Compliance said that while Gowdy was acting as chairman of the House Select Committee on Benghazi, a former congressional aide of his reached a settlement with Congress and the House Employment Counsel. The aide had alleged he was fired in part because he was not willing to focus his investigative work on Hillary Clinton (a charge which was later dropped) and because he was absent from the position while fulfilling an Air Force Reserve assignment. His attorney stated "I can confirm that my client is one person who brought a veterans status discrimination and retaliation suit against Congress and that the case settled on terms that were satisfactory to my client.” The Washington Post reported that Gowdy was responsible for use of taxpayer funds to pay the claim against the government.

Personal life 
Gowdy is married to Terri (born Terri Dillard) Gowdy, a former Miss Spartanburg and 2nd runner up for Miss South Carolina. The couple have two children, Watson and Abigail. As of January 2019, Terri Dillard Gowdy was a first-grade teacher in the Spartanburg School District.

Electoral history

References

External links

 
 
 
 Profile  at Spartanburg County Government site

|-

|-

|-

1964 births
21st-century American politicians
Assistant United States Attorneys
Baylor University alumni
Living people
Fox News people
Politicians from Greenville, South Carolina
Politicians from Spartanburg, South Carolina
Republican Party members of the United States House of Representatives from South Carolina
South Carolina lawyers
South Carolina state solicitors
Southern Baptists
Tea Party movement activists
University of South Carolina School of Law alumni